Yuri language may refer to: 
Karkar language of New Guinea (also known as Yuri)
Yuri language (Amazon) (or Yurí)